The first season of the reality series The Osbournes premiered on MTV on March 5 and concluded on May 7, 2002 with a total of 10 episodes. The series follows the lives of Ozzy Osbourne and his family. This season garnered the show a Primetime Emmy Award for Outstanding Reality Program.

Episodes

References

External links 
 

2002 American television seasons